The Last Airbender is a 2010 American action-adventure fantasy film written, co-produced and directed by M. Night Shyamalan, produced by Nickelodeon Movies and distributed by Paramount Pictures. Based on the first season of the Nickelodeon animated television series Avatar: The Last Airbender, the film stars Noah Ringer as Aang, with Dev Patel, Nicola Peltz and Jackson Rathbone playing Prince Zuko, Katara and Sokka. The film tells the story of Aang, a young Avatar who must master all four elements of air, water, fire and earth and restore balance to the world while stopping the Fire Nation from conquering the Water Tribes and the Earth Kingdom.

Development for the film began in January 2007, and the casting and pre-production process happened during 2008. Filming began on March 2009 and ended on September 2009, with a preliminary schedule held in Greenland for two weeks, and the rest of the film were shot in major locations across Pennsylvania, United States. Post-production began in August and took several months due to extensive visual effects. The name Avatar was dropped from the title to avoid confusion with James Cameron's 2009 film Avatar.

The Last Airbender premiered in New York City on June 30, 2010, and was theatrically released in United States the following day. The film was lambasted by critics, audiences and fans of the animated series who criticized the screenplay, acting, direction, casting, effects, editing, action sequences, story, unfaithfulness to the source material, characters, and 3D conversion, and was named the worst film of 2010 and even one of worst films of all time by several publications. Produced on a $150 million budget, the film grossed $131 million domestically and $319 million worldwide. The Last Airbender was originally envisioned as the first of a trilogy of films based on the three seasons of the series, but due to the negative backlash and disappointing box office performance of the film, the planned trilogy was ultimately scrapped.

Plot
A century has passed since the Fire Nation declared war on the other three nations of air, water, and earth in their attempt to conquer the world. Sokka and his younger sister Katara, who live in the Southern Water Tribe, discover an unusual iceberg. Breaking into the iceberg releases a beam of light and reveals a 12-year-old boy named Aang and his pet flying bison Appa.

Zuko, the disgraced prince of the Fire Nation, detects the light from Aang's release and arrives at the Southern Water Tribe to demand the villagers hand over the Avatar: the only person capable of manipulating, or "bending", all four elements of air, water, earth, and fire. Aang surrenders himself to save the village, but escapes the Fire Nation ship and flies to Appa, brought by Katara and Sokka. The trio travel to Aang's homeland at the Southern Air Temple, where Aang learns he was in the iceberg for a century and that the Fire Nation wiped out the other Air Nomads, including his guardian Monk Gyatso. In despair, Aang enters the Avatar State and finds himself in the Spirit World where he encounters a Dragon Spirit. Katara's pleas bring Aang out of the Avatar State.

The group arrives at an Earth Kingdom village controlled by the Fire Nation. When they are arrested and imprisoned, they incite a rebellion, battling and defeating the Fire Nation soldiers occupying the village. Aang tells Katara and Sokka that he only knows airbending and has yet to master the other three elements. They make their way to the Northern Water Tribe where Aang can learn from waterbending masters.

During a side trip to the Northern Air Temple, Aang is betrayed by a peasant and captured by Fire Nation archers led by Commander Zhao. However, a masked marauder called the Blue Spirit helps Aang escape. Zhao realizes that Zuko is the Blue Spirit, and has a crossbowman fire a bolt that knocks Zuko out, but Aang uses his skills to escape with the unconscious Zuko. Aang watches over Zuko until morning, then leaves to reunite with Sokka and Katara. Zhao tries again to kill Zuko by blowing up his ship, but Zuko secretly survives and sneaks aboard Zhao's ship.

Upon arriving, Aang and company are welcomed by the citizens of the Northern Water Tribe, and waterbending master Pakku teaches Aang and Katara. The Fire Nation arrives and Zhao begins his attack while Zuko continues his independent search for the Avatar. After defeating Katara in battle, Zuko captures Aang, who reenters the Avatar State to search for the Dragon Spirit for help to defeat the Fire Nation. The Dragon Spirit advises him to "use the ocean and show the power of water".

Returning to his body, Aang battles Zuko until Katara freezes Zuko in ice, then leaves to join the battle. Zuko's uncle Iroh and Zhao make their way to a sacred cave where Zhao captures the Moon Spirit. Despite Iroh's pleas, Zhao kills the Moon Spirit to strip all the waterbenders of their abilities. Enraged by Zhao's sacrilege, Iroh reveals his mastery of firebending, frightening Zhao and his entourage out of the sacred cave. Princess Yue gives her life to revive the Moon Spirit. Zhao finds out Zuko survived and they prepare to fight, but Iroh talks Zuko out of it and Zhao is drowned by waterbenders. Recalling his life before being trapped in the ice, Aang enters the Avatar State and raises the ocean into a gigantic wall to drive the Fire Nation back.

Zuko's father Fire Lord Ozai learns of the defeat and tasks his daughter Princess Azula with preventing the Avatar from mastering earth and fire.

Cast

Production

Development
On January 8, 2007, Paramount Pictures and Nickelodeon Movies announced that they had signed M. Night Shyamalan to write, direct, and produce a trilogy of live-action films based on Avatar: The Last Airbender. The first of these films was to be a faithful adaptation of the main characters' adventures in Book One: Water. According to an interview with the co-creators in SFX magazine, Shyamalan came across Avatar: The Last Airbender when his daughter wanted to be Katara for Halloween. Intrigued, Shyamalan researched and watched the series with his family. "Watching Avatar has become a family event in my house... so we are looking forward to how the story develops in season three," said Shyamalan. "Once I saw the amazing world that Mike and Bryan created, I knew it would make a great feature film". He added he was attracted to the spiritual and martial arts influences on the show.

Avatar: The Last Airbender co-creators Michael Dante DiMartino and Bryan Konietzko voiced their opinion in an interview regarding Shyamalan writing, directing, and producing the film. The two displayed much enthusiasm over Shyamalan's decision for the adaptation, stating that they admire his work and, in turn, he respects their material. In a 2014 interview, Konietzko and DiMartino said that the project was given the go-ahead without their approval, and when they tried to provide input, it all got pushed to the wayside. Konietzko added even further that "A) We didn't want it to be done at all. Before anyone was attached, we didn't want it. And then B) If it was going to be done, we wanted to do it, but they weren't going to let us. C) When they attached Night, we just thought, 'Well, this is what we've been dealt. We'll just offer help when it's asked of us, and if it's not, we'll stay out of the way'. In the beginning, it was more positive and we offered help, but then we had a big falling out". Producer Frank Marshall stated he hoped for the film to achieve a family-friendly rating: "I'm not even sure we want to get in the PG-13 realm." Furthermore, Shyamalan said, "A lot of the inspiration for the direction we took comes from a friend of mine. A Nathan Blackmer helped shape this Idea into the film it became. I took away a little bit of the slapsticky stuff that was there for the little little kids, the fart jokes and things like that...We grounded Katara's brother...and that really did wonderful things for the whole theme of the movie." Brad Grey said that despite the director's career being inconsistent, he "believed in [Shyamalan's] vision and that he could execute it," adding that "It's a bold step because he had to create a potential new franchise." The studio was willing to spend $250 million on a trilogy of films, one for each season. The Last Airbender'''s budget wound up being $150 million, in addition to over $130 million spent on marketing costs, making it Shyamalan's most expensive film. During production, the name Avatar was removed from the title to avoid confusion with the highly successful 2009 film Avatar.

Casting
Shyamalan originally offered the roles of Aang to Noah Ringer; Sokka to Jackson Rathbone; Katara to Nicola Peltz; and Zuko to Jesse McCartney. In an interview with People, Shyamalan claimed that he did not want to make The Last Airbender without Nicola Peltz, "I said that only once before in my career, and that was when I met Haley in The Sixth Sense auditions."
In February 2009, Dev Patel replaced Jesse McCartney, whose tour dates conflicted with a boot camp scheduled for the cast to train in martial arts. However, McCartney has since claimed that he had been replaced by the producers for political reasons shortly before filming began, and had no say in the matter. Katharine Houghton played "Gran Gran", the grandmother of Katara and Sokka, and Seychelle Gabriel portrayed Princess Yue, a love interest of Sokka's and princess of the Northern Water Tribe. Isaac Jin Solstein played an earthbending boy. Comedian Aasif Mandvi was cast as Commander Zhao, Cliff Curtis as Fire Lord Ozai, and Keong Sim was cast in the role of an Earthbender.

Ringer began practicing Taekwondo – the martial art and national sport of Korea – at the age of 10. He began shaving his head during his martial arts training to help cool off, which gave him the nickname "Avatar" due to his resemblance to Aang from the animated series. When he heard about the film adaptation, he made an audition tape with his instructor and sent it to the filmmakers. Having not acted before, Ringer was required to attend acting school a month before filming commenced. Peltz was familiar with the character before submitting for the part of Katara, having been a fan of the animated series.

Before Slumdog Millionaire was released, Patel auditioned for the role of Zuko by submitting a tape to the studio. Shyamalan called Patel personally to inform him that he got the part. Training for the film was intense, as he had to learn Wushu and different martial arts. Patel recalls fighting, punching, and throwing, and said the experience was "truly amazing." While he was filming Slumdog in India, he would finish a take and turn one of the channels over to the animated series. Even though it is based on a cartoon, he wanted to bring as much of himself as possible to the character he was portraying. Shaun Toub, who was cast as Iroh, describes his character in the first film as "loose" and "free". He compares Zuko's "obsession" to his childhood memories and how kids are always looking for their parents' approval, saying that Zuko just wants his father's. "He isn't necessarily bad; he just has a great deal of built up anger and forgets to consider others. I think people will understand that he's not bad, he's just angry and hurting because he really wants his father to love him, but his father is too busy with other things." He says that Patel was able to influence him into appreciating the business of filmmaking more. While comparing the animated series to the film, he says the film is much more serious. He attributed this change to the director trying to relate to every age group, rather than just kids.

Casting controversy
The casting of white actors in the East Asian and Inuit-influenced Avatar universe, as well as the fact that the casting of the heroes and villains seemed to be racially backward from the show, triggered negative reactions from  fans marked by accusations of racism, a letter-writing campaign, and various protests. "To take this incredibly loved children's series, and really distort not only the ethnicity of the individual characters but the message of acceptance and cultural diversity that the original series advocated, is a huge blow," said Michael Le of Racebending.com, a fan site calling for a boycott of the film. As a result of the casting, the Media Action Network for Asian-Americans also called for a boycott of the film. "This was a great opportunity to create new Asian-American stars...I'm disappointed," stated Guy Aoki, president of the organization. After a casting call specifically looking for "Caucasians and other ethnicities," Shyamalan explained that "Ultimately, this movie, and then the three movies, will be the most culturally diverse tent-pole movies ever released, period." to reassure critics. Furthermore, Paramount provided a statement about the casting choices, "The movie has 23 credited speaking roles – more than half of which feature Asian and Pan Asian actors of Korean, Japanese and Indian descent. The filmmaker's interpretation reflects the myriad qualities that have made this series a global phenomenon. We believe fans of the original and new audiences alike will respond positively once they see it."

Shyamalan commented on the issues regarding fans' perceptions of the casting, "Anime is based on ambiguous facial features. It's meant to be interpretive. It's meant to be inclusive of all races, and you can see yourself in all these characters...This is a multicultural movie and I'm going to make it even more multicultural in my approach to its casting. There's African-Americans in the movie...so it's a source of pride for me. The irony that [protesters] would label this with anything but the greatest pride, that the movie poster has Noah and Dev on it and my name on it. I don't know what else to do."
Rathbone also dismissed the complaints saying, "I think it's one of those things where I pull my hair up, shave the sides, and I definitely need a tan. It's one of those things where, hopefully, the audience will suspend disbelief a little bit." The controversy was poorly received by critics as well. Film critic Roger Ebert was one of the critical voices against the casting. When asked about casting a white cast to portray the characters, he said, "The original series Avatar: The Last Airbender was highly regarded and popular for three seasons on Nickelodeon. Its fans take it for granted that its heroes are Asian. Why would Paramount and Shyamalan go out of their way to offend these fans? There are many young Asian actors capable of playing the parts."

In July 2013, series co-creator Bryan Konietzko responded to an online comment about skin color in The Legend of Korra. Konietzko wrote that his work on the two series "speaks for itself which obviously does not include the gross misinterpretations and misrepresentations of our work in [Shyamalan's] work."

Filming
Pre-production began in late 2008, while filming began on 13 March 2009 in Greenland. After two weeks, the cast and crew moved to Reading, Pennsylvania, where production designers and special effects crews worked for several weeks, preparing the local site for the film. A production team scouting the area found the Pagoda on Mount Penn, which served as an ancient temple in the film. Reading mayor Tom McMahon explained that crews made road  improvements and buried electrical lines surrounding the structure.

Filming also took place in Ontelaunee Township and at the William Penn Memorial Fire Tower in Pennsylvania after the production crew finished at the Pagoda. Some scenes were also shot in Philadelphia after the Berks Economic Development company showed the production "a number of buildings, but couldn't come up with enough to meet their requirements" because "they needed buildings to shoot all the interiors, and were looking for a group of buildings with high ceilings and specific column spacing". The production offices were leased from Temple University Health System at its corporate offices located at 2450 West Hunting Park Avenue. Rehearsals also took place at this location. Filming took place inside the abandoned Budd Company complex across the street, which was fitted out as a studio including temporary air conditioning piped into the set. Filming ended on 26 September 2009.

Visual effects
Pablo Helman, who previously worked on Star Wars: Episode II – Attack of the Clones, was the visual effects supervisor for the Industrial Light and Magic team on the film. He worked with Shyamalan, reviewing each scene and talking about the visual effects needed to tell the story, and ultimately worked with about 300 people to reflect the director's vision, who he said storyboarded it.

Industrial Light and Magic were tasked with visualizing the elemental tribes of Air, Water, Earth, and Fire; most importantly creating the "bending" styles of these elements. Additionally, they were required to animate creatures and enhance stunt work with digital doubles. "The work was challenging," shares Helman. "We had to figure out what "bending" is for fire, water, air and earth." The project was started without the desired technology needed to create the effects. Rather than software, computer graphic cards were the basis for "bending" the elements, allowing previews to be viewed more swiftly. This resulted in Shyamalan having to direct more than sixty takes before the effect was finished and lined up with his visions.

Due to reality-based expectations, fire and water were the hardest elements to effectively bend, and because of particle work which was unable to be rendered in hardware, earth bending also was difficult to create. With water, the variety in different scales required Helman and his team to create different techniques. The concept for air was derived from the animation of the television series. To create the air bending effect, visual effects art director Christian Alzman and digital matte department supervisor Barry Williams explained that seeing dust and snow particles, rather than seeing the air itself, helped shape the real-world effect of bending the element. Before the bending effects could be applied, though, the actor's movements had to be matched; Shyamalan, therefore, wanted each character's bending styles to be unique to fit with their unique personalities.

The challenge for fire did not come with making it look realistic, but rather making the fire behave in an unrealistic way that would be believable to the audience. The film that inspired The Last Airbenders fire style was the sixth Harry Potter film, which was re-engineered to reflect two-dimensional simulations. Helman's team referenced images of flames being pushed through the air by giant fans for certain shots needed throughout the film. The team also considered using a meshed image of real and digital fire, but in the end, went with the richer, deeper texture of computer-generated flame.

The film also used matte paintings, which had to be in 3D because the visual style included long-duration shots in which the camera always moved. The climax, which was enacted on a  set, had to be merged with stills of the Greenland landscapes, as well as the low-angle lighting that was captured on location there. The camera was animated to get angles needed for different shots in the film by importing these stills into the computer. Multiple cameras were utilized to achieve the different wire-work and animation that was used to create the creatures and many fight scenes within the film. In creating these creatures, the team looked at various real-world creatures to influence the look of the lemur Momo's wings. In order for them to be believable, they looked for examples of the same size and weight as the animated character and then produced hybrids from different animals to make each species distinct. This was done by observing actual animals to get a take on how they would act. Shyamalan's take on the personality of each creature also influenced the creation stage of the creatures. For example, Momo has flying mechanics based on a giant fruit bat. Other elements, such as texturing, hair or scale simulation, and light and shadow complementary to the live action, were added to make the final animation appear as real as possible during the later stages of character development.

Paramount Pictures made an announcement in late April 2010, revealing that The Last Airbender would be released in 3D. This decision came after an increasing number of films being made or converted to 3D, such as Avatar, Alice in Wonderland and Clash of the Titans, made a decent profit at the box office. Although Helman stated that Shyamalan's way of shooting without fast edits and the film's visuals could lend itself to the 3D conversion well, James Cameron voiced his disapproval on any film being converted using this process, saying, "You can slap a 3-D label on it and call it 3-D, but there's no possible way that it can be done up to a standard that anybody would consider high enough." Despite this, Shyamalan opted to work with Stereo D LLC, the company who worked on James Cameron's own Avatar. The conversion process for the film cost between $5 million and $10 million, adding to the reported $100 million that already went into the film.

Music

In December 2008, James Newton Howard was announced as the composer for The Last Airbender. The film marks the seventh collaboration between Howard and M. Night Shyamalan, with the latest being the 2008 film The Happening. On May 13, 2009, producer Frank Marshall announced that Howard was recording music for the teaser trailer that was later released that summer; it was later confirmed by Marshall that all of the film's trailers featured original music by Howard himself. The soundtrack, released by Lakeshore Records on June 29, 2010, required Howard to hire a 119-member ensemble. Running at about 66 minutes, it contains eleven tracks ranging from three to seven minutes, and one track, "Airbender Suite", that is nearly eleven minutes long. Reviews for the score were overwhelmingly positive.

Marketing
Promotion
The teaser trailer for the film was attached to Transformers: Revenge of the Fallen, released in theaters on June 24, 2009. The teaser trailer was also shown exclusively on the June 22, 2009 episode of Entertainment Tonight. The trailer shows Aang airbending in a temple which is being attacked by a multitude of Fire Nation ships. Three additional trailers were released leading up to the film's release.

The first TV spot aired during Super Bowl XLIV on February 7, 2010. It showed parts of the film that were not shown in the teaser trailer and had no diagetic dialogue, but merely narration. On February 10, the theatrical trailer was released online.

On February 9, 2010, Nickelodeon Consumer Products also debuted the upcoming line of toys based on The Last Airbender. It includes various 3-inch action figures, as well as larger, action-enabled figures, costumes, and other props. Among the toys featured in the line were figures based on Aang, Prince Zuko, Sokka, Katara, and a fully ride-able Appa the Sky Bison. "We worked very closely with M. Night, the rest of the Paramount team and our in-house design team, along with our partner Spin-Master, to come up with the right assortment, the right size for these action figures and make sure we had representation of all the nations within the 'Airbender' series," said Nickelodeon's Lourdes Arocho. The Last Airbender action figures released in three "waves"; with wave one beginning on June 1, wave two near the film's July release date, and wave three near the 2010 holiday season. THQ Studio Australia also developed a video game based on the film, which was released on June 29, 2010, for the Wii and the Nintendo DS.

Graphic novels
Two original black-and-white graphic novels, entitled The Last Airbender Prequel: Zuko's Story and The Last Airbender, drawn in the manga style, were written by Dave Roman and Alison Wilgus. "Avatar: The Last Airbender has shown incredible crossover appeal with manga fans. The release of The Last Airbender movie and original tie-in manga gives us the chance to share completely new stories with Avatar fans looking for more about Aang, Zuko, and their favorite characters." Dallas Middaugh, Associate Publisher of Del Rey Manga said in a statement. The second manga was released on June 22, 2010. The plot, like the film, is a condensed version of the first season of the series.

The prequel, Zuko's Story, is co-written by Alison Wilgus and Dave Roman and illustrated by Nina Matsumoto and was released on May 18, 2010. The synopsis for the graphic novel was released in early 2010, "When Prince Zuko dared to question authority, his father, Fire Lord Ozai, banished him from the Fire Nation. Horribly scarred and stripped of everything he held dear, Zuko has wandered the earth for almost three years in search of his only chance at redemption: the Avatar, a mystical being who once kept the four nations in balance. Everyone he encounters believes that this is an impossible task, as the Avatar disappeared a century ago. But Zuko stubbornly continues the search. He must regain his honor, so his quest is all he has left."

Roman and Wilgus, who developed comics based on the series for Nick Magazine, consulted series creators Mike Dante DiMartino and Bryan Konietzko, and the head writer for the show Aaron Ehasz while they were developing Zuko's Story. The four wanted to try a comic that would fit into with the continuity of the show. The prequel, though mostly associated with the film, was meant to be a prequel to the series. Roman explained, "In a lot of ways, it's like an expanded origin. With the film and the series, there are differences and there are places where they split off, but the setup for both is exactly the same – so when you're introduced to the characters, that's the part where they're completely identical." The prequel allowed the expansions of different details told in the series; for example, an episode called "The Blue Spirit" in the series was seen in the film. However, since explaining everything that happened in that episode was hard to translate onto film, the prequel allowed for them to "delve" into that specific story. What more, when asked about whether he answered some questions that were left open at the end of the series, Roman stated that, while he had a strong relationship with the show's creators and got their blessing for his project, it wasn't his plot to address.

Release
To avoid confusion with James Cameron's Avatar, the title was changed from Avatar: The Last Airbender to simply The Last Airbender. The film premiered in New York City on June 30, 2010, and opened the following day in 3,169 theaters, against The Twilight Saga: Eclipse which also stars Jackson Rathbone.

Home mediaThe Last Airbender was released on DVD and Blu-ray on November 16, 2010. At the same time, a Blu-ray 3D version was also made available exclusively at Best Buy locations. The Last Airbender was re-released on DVD and Blu-ray on April 25, 2017. The film has earned $48.7 million from DVD/Blu-ray sales, with 1.6 million DVDs and 300,000 Blu-ray discs sold as of December 2010.

Reception
Box officeThe Last Airbender had grossed $131,772,187 in the United States, and $187,941,694 in other countries, making for a total of $319,713,881 worldwide. On its opening day in the United States, The Last Airbender made $16,614,112, ranking fifth overall for Thursday openings, and placed second behind The Twilight Saga: Eclipse. For its opening three-day, Fourth of July weekend, The Last Airbender accumulated a total of $40,325,019. The following Monday, it grossed $11,479,213. 54% of its total gross was from 3D presentations at 1,606 screens. On Thursday, July 1, 2010, its opening day, it debuted at #2 behind The Twilight Saga: Eclipse. Opening internationally in 923 sites, the film grossed an estimated $9 million, $8 million of which was from 870 sites in Russia, making it the number one film there. The film grossed $9.4 million from its second weekend in international markets. The film was the twentieth highest-grossing film of 2010, and is the fourth-highest-grossing film produced by Nickelodeon Movies, behind The SpongeBob Movie: Sponge Out of Water (2015), Teenage Mutant Ninja Turtles (2014), and The Adventures of Tintin (2011). 

Critical response
On Rotten Tomatoes, The Last Airbender holds an approval rating of 5%, based on 193 reviews with an average rating of 3/10, making it the lowest-rated film produced by Nickelodeon Movies, as well as Shyamalan's worst-reviewed film to date. The site's critical consensus reads, "The Last Airbender squanders its popular source material with incomprehensible plotting, horrible acting, and detached joyless direction." On Metacritic, it has a weighted average score of 20 out of 100, based on 33 reviews, indicating "generally unfavorable reviews". Audiences polled by CinemaScore gave the film an average rating of "C" on an A+ to F scale.

Liam Lacey of The Globe and Mail stated the film had little chance to develop its characters and therefore suffered, with the overall storyline of the film becoming a run-on narrative. According to Owen Gleiberman from Entertainment Weekly, who gave the film a C, "The Last Airbender keeps throwing things at you, but its final effect is, in every way, flat." Roger Ebert of the Chicago Sun-Times gave the film half a star in his review, stating that it "bores and alienates its audiences," and notes the poor use of 3D among the film's faults. Keith Phipps of The A.V. Club gave the film an F, criticizing the performances of the child actors, overuse of exposition, and shoehorned 3D special effects, calling it the worst summer blockbuster of 2010. Kirk Honeycutt of The Hollywood Reporter said that the lack of correct casting caused the film to lose substantial credibility in regard to its source material, but did praise the casting and acting of Ringer as Aang. Peter Debruge of Variety criticized the casting and the score, saying that the overall effect of each play into making the film a bore.  Rifftrax put the film at number 5 of The Top 10 Worst Movies of All Time, saying "We CAN state for the record that it is quite easy to detest this movie even if you've never seen a frame of the TV show."

Charlie Jane Anders in the review by io9 criticized "the personality-free hero, the nonsensical plot twists, the CG clutter, the bland romance, the new-age pablum...", concluding that "Shyamalan's true achievement in this film is that he takes a thrilling cult TV series, Avatar: The Last Airbender, and he systematically leeches all the personality and soul out of it – in order to create something generic enough to serve as a universal spoof of every epic, ever." Anders summarized the experience of watching the film by stating that, "Actually, my exact words when I walked out of this film were, 'Wow, this makes Dragonball Evolution look like a masterpiece.'" Ain't It Cool News' review questioned why Shyamalan was allowed to write the script, as well as why he was even chosen to direct such a high-profile film after a string of previous flops: "Burdened by [a] never-ending onslaught of expository dialogue awkwardly delivered by actors giving career-worst performances across the board, The Last Airbender is so outrageously bad it's a wonder it ever got before cameras."

Scott Bowles of USA Today gave a generally favorable review, claiming that Shyamalan delivered on fight scenes and the film worked as a kid's film, although he also added that poor scriptwriting made some of the performances sound wooden. Another favorable review came from Stephanie Zacharek of MovieLine, who praised the way Shyamalan captures the art of action and human motion. David Roark of Relevant Magazine accused other critics of having a bias against Shyamalan and gave the film a positive review, stating that its visuals and heart far outweighed the clunky plotting and "awful" dialogue.

Peter Bradshaw of The Guardian noted an unfortunate linguistic problem that reduced British viewers to "a state of nervous collapse" due to laughter. In British English, 'bent' is a slang term for gay, with 'bender' meaning a gay man, giving an entirely different meaning to lines such as, "I could tell at once that you were a bender." Bradshaw commented that the response from the audience to such lines was "deafeningly immature" and would "inevitably be repeated in every cinema in the land showing The Last Airbender." Bradshaw expressed his amazement that Shyamalan has managed to make a film worse than Lady in the Water or The Happening. Kirk Honneycut of The Hollywood Reporter wrote, "Shyamalan, who never has mounted an epic film before, gets only passing grades. Huge sets and unit work from Greenland to New Zealand all look strangely underlit. One wonders whether the projector blew a light bulb. The movie was foolishly converted to 3D after principal photography, but if anything, this conversion is worse than Clash of the Titans." A Collider.com review says: "I'm calling it: The Last Airbender is the worst movie of 2010. It's too disturbing to consider that there could be something even more hideous out there."

Crew responses
Shyamalan argued that his style and art-form of storytelling resulted in the negative reviews of the film and compared it to asking a painter to change to a different style: "I bring as much integrity to the table as humanly possible. It must be a language thing, in terms of a particular accent, a storytelling accent. I can only see it this certain way and I don't know how to think in another language. I think these are exactly the visions that are in my head, so I don't know how to adjust it without being me."

Shyamalan also addressed criticisms about the barely 90-minute runtime of the film, which was considered bizarre given that it had to condense a 20-episode TV season into one film, and is a far shorter runtime than is typical for summer blockbusters. Shyamalan's response was that all of his previous films were 90 minutes because they were small-scale supernatural thrillers, and as a result, his instinct for the pacing of the film was to edit it down to 90 minutes. This short runtime indirectly led to several other problems which multiple critics objected to: characters frequently resort to giving long speeches of exposition to summarize entire scenes that were cut for time, and a running voiceover commentary by Katara was added in which she summarizes entire subplots (e.g. Sokka's relationship with Yue) that barely appear on-screen.

When Shyamalan gave the Ashok C. Sani Distinguished Scholar-in-Residence lecture at NYU's Stern School of Business on April 16, 2019, he revealed that he regretted accepting the directing position on the film, stating "There has always been this inexorable pull to join the group, a constant seduction in the form of whatever you want to tally, in the form of money, or safety, ease, not getting criticized. I did these movies, and I rightfully got crushed, because they rightfully said, 'You don't believe in yourself, you don't believe in your own voice, and you don't believe in your values." Shyamalan would go on to begin financing his own projects as a result.

Dev Patel expressed regret and dislike for his role and his experience with the film. At a 2016 actor's roundtable with The Hollywood Reporter while promoting his film Lion during Oscar contender season, Patel said, "I don't know what I would like to play, but I know what I'm afraid of playing: those big studio movies. After Slumdog, I did a film that was not well received at all. The budget of Slumdog was like the budget of the craft services of this movie." He added, “I completely felt overwhelmed by the experience. I felt like I wasn't being heard. That was really scary for me, and that's really when I learned the power of no, the idea of saying no. Listen to that instinct you get when you read those words for the first time." He described his performance as Prince Zuko as being as though he "saw a stranger on the screen that I couldn't relate to." In a question-and-answer session on Reddit with Dante Basco, the original voice of Prince Zuko, when he was asked what he thought of the Last Airbender film, he responded by saying that the show's creators, Konietzko and DiMartino, told him not to see it.

AccoladesThe Last Airbender received nine nominations at the 31st Golden Raspberry Awards including Worst Picture. The film went on to sweep the Razzies with five awards: Worst Picture, Worst Director (Shyamalan), Worst Screenplay (Shyamalan), Worst Supporting Actor (Jackson Rathbone), and a special award, "Worst Eye-Gouging Mis-Use of 3D."

Cancelled sequels
Shyamalan or Paramount/Nickelodeon did not immediately confirm the "go-ahead" or whether the plug would be pulled on the trilogy. While filming The Last Airbender, Shyamalan mapped out a rough draft for a second film that was "darker" and includes Azula, portrayed by Summer Bishil, as the main antagonist. In a July 2010 interview with New York Magazine, Shyamalan commented "In the next few months we'll be able to know whether we have that opportunity or not" when asked about the sequel. No such announcement was made, and in a September 2010 interview when asked if he knew when the sequel will be made, he replied, "I don't, because there are so many factors they take into account", adding, "I guess it will get into an area where it becomes a discussion – like pros and cons." In September 2015, Shyamalan told Metro UK that he may work on the sequel after completing his next thriller, which was supposed to start shooting in November 2015.

In October 2018, an unrelated live-action remake of the original Avatar: The Last Airbender for Netflix was announced, ending any lingering speculation of a potential sequel to The Last Airbender''.

See also

 List of Avatar: The Last Airbender characters
 List of films considered the worst

References

External links

 
 
 
 
 

2010 films
2010 3D films
2010s fantasy adventure films
American 3D films
American children's adventure films
American fantasy adventure films
Avatar: The Last Airbender
Films about reincarnation
Films shot in Greenland
Films shot in Pennsylvania
Films shot in Vietnam
Live-action films based on animated series
Blinding Edge Pictures films
The Kennedy/Marshall Company films
Paramount Pictures films
Race-related controversies in film
Casting controversies in film
Film controversies
Nickelodeon Movies films
Films scored by James Newton Howard
Films directed by M. Night Shyamalan
Films produced by Frank Marshall
Films produced by M. Night Shyamalan
Films with screenplays by M. Night Shyamalan
Golden Raspberry Award winning films
2010 martial arts films
American martial arts films
Films set in Antarctica
2010s English-language films
2010s American films